Little Angel Theatre is a puppet theatre for children and their families based in the London Borough of Islington.

The 100-seat theatre, a former Temperance hall, was opened on 24 November 1961, by founders John and Lyndie Wright with a performance of The Wild Night Of The Witches.

As well as an internationally recognised theatre with productions touring throughout the UK and across the globe, Little Angel Theatre works with its local community to tackle barriers to arts engagement so all can benefit and enjoy the art form of puppetry.

Puppeteers who have entertained here include Sarah Burgess who has created several roles for CBeebies.

The theatre's creative learning department work with schools and youth and community groups, running a wide variety of participation activities.

Little Angel Theatre is a registered charity.

References

Further reading
John Wright Rod, Shadow and Glove: Puppets from the Little Angel Theatre (HarperCollins 1986)

External links
Theatre website

Theatres in the London Borough of Islington
Puppet theaters
Theatres completed in 1961
Buildings and structures in Islington
Puppetry in the United Kingdom